Krishnapparunthu is a 1979 Indian Malayalam film, directed by O. Ramdas and produced by Babu Varghese Nambiaparambil. The film stars P. Jayachandran, Madhu, Srividya and Sreelatha Namboothiri in the lead roles. The film has musical score by Shyam.

Cast
 
P. Jayachandran 
Madhu 
Srividya 
Sreelatha Namboothiri 
Prathapachandran 
Ambika 
Bahadoor 
Dr. Namboothiri
K. P. Ummer

Soundtrack
The music was composed by Shyam and the lyrics were written by Onakkoor Radhakrishnan.

References

External links
 

1979 films
1970s Malayalam-language films